The National Labour Congress (NLC) is the sole national trade union centre of Saint Vincent and the Grenadines.  The affiliated unions of the NLC are: Commercial, Technical and Allied Workers Union, the St. Vincent and the Grenadines Teachers' Union, Public Service Union, the National Workers Movement (NWM), the LIAT Workers' Union, the Windward Islands Farmers' Association, the Nurses' Association and the Medical Association.

See also
 List of trade unions
 List of federations of trade unions

References
 Country Paper on Collective Bargaining - Saint Vincent
 International Workers Day - St Vincent NBC Radio, 30 April 2008.
 "Organized Labor in St. Vincent and the Grenadines" in A History of Organized Labor in the English-speaking West Indies by Robert J. Alexander, Eldon M. Parker Greenwood Publishing Group, 2004 

National federations of trade unions
Trade unions in Saint Vincent and the Grenadines

Trade unions established in 1994